Soro Gbema is a chiefdom in Pujehun District of Sierra Leone with a population of 31,977. Its principal town is Fairo.

References

Chiefdoms of Sierra Leone
Southern Province, Sierra Leone